The Life of Shakespeare is a 1914 British silent biographical film directed by Frank R. Growcott and J.B. McDowell and starring Albert Ward, Sybil Hare and George Foley. It follows the life of the English playwright William Shakespeare.

Cast
 Albert Ward - William Shakespeare
 Sybil Hare - Anne Hathaway
 George Foley - Sir Thomas Lucy
 Aimee Martinek - Queen Elizabeth
 M. Gray Murray - Sir Hugh Clopton
 Eva Bayley  - Mrs Shakespeare
 Miss Bennett - Charlotte Clopton

References

External links

1914 films
British biographical films
1910s historical films
British silent feature films
British black-and-white films
1910s biographical films
1910s English-language films
1910s British films